Edmond Gustave Camus (1852 – 22 
August 1915) was a French pharmacist and botanist known for his work with orchids.

A pharmacist by vocation, he was a resident of L'Isle-Adam, a community near Paris. He was the father of botanist Aimée Antoinette Camus (1879–1965), with whom he collaborated on several projects, and the painter Blanche-Augustine Camus (1881-1968). For a period of time, he served as vice-president of the Société botanique de France.

As a taxonomist, he was the binomial authority of many species, most notably within the family Orchidaceae. With Aimée Camus, he described numerous species from the family Salicaceae.

Selected works 
 Iconographie des orchidées des environs de Paris, 1885 – Iconography of orchids from the environs of Paris.
 Catalogue des plantes de France, de Suisse et de Belgique, 1888 – Catalog of plants from France, Switzerland and Belgium. 
 Monographie des orchidées de France, 1894 – Monograph of orchids from France.
 Orchidées hybrides, ou, Critiques du Gers, 1898 – Orchid hybrids. 
 Les plantes médicinales indigènes, 1901 – Indigenous medicinal plants.
 Classification des saules d'Europe et monographie des saules d'France (with Aimée Camus), 1904 – Classification of willows found in Europe and a monograph of French willows. 
 "A Contribution to the Study of Spontaneous Hybrids in the European Flora" (published in English, 1907).
 Monographie des orchidées de l'Europe: de l'Afrique septentrionale, de l'Asie Mineure et des provinces Russes transcaspiennes (with Paul Bergon, Aimée Camus), 1908 – Monograph of orchids from Europe, northern Africa, Asia Minor and the Russian Trans-Caspian provinces.
 Iconographie des orchidées d'Europe et du bassin Méditerranéen, (with Aimée Camus) 1921 – Iconography of orchids from Europe and the Mediterranean Basin.

He also made notable contributions to the multi-volume Flore de France: Ou, Description Des Plantes Qui Croissent Spontanément en France, en Corse Et en Alsace-Lorraine.

References 

1852 births
1915 deaths
French pharmacists
19th-century French botanists
Orchidologists
20th-century French botanists